Elmas (Sardinian: Su Masu) is a comune (municipality) of the Metropolitan City of Cagliari in the Italian region of Sardinia, located about  northwest of Cagliari.

Until 1989 Elmas was a district of Cagliari. According to 2011 census, it has 8,949 inhabitants.

Climate
Elmas has a hot-summer Mediterranean climate (Köppen: Csa) with summers being very hot and dry and winter mild and humid, associated with high subtropical pressure. The snow turns out to be a rare phenomenon, unlike mountains not so distant. Its precipitation values also bring it closer to semi-arid conditions.

Notes

References

External links 

 Official website

Cities and towns in Sardinia
Geography of Cagliari
1989 establishments in Italy
States and territories established in 1989
States and territories disestablished in 1937